"PENKI" is Japanese voice actress and singer Maaya Uchida's 1st album, released on December 2, 2015.

Track listings

Charts

Event 
 『 Maaya Party！Vol.4 』　Maaya Uchida 1st Album Release Event「Maaya Party！Vol.4」（December 5, 2015 - December 12, 2015：Tokyo, Aichi, Osaka）

References

2015 debut albums
J-pop albums
Japanese-language albums
Pony Canyon albums